Rumfordia is a genus of Mesoamerican plants in the tribe Millerieae within the family Asteraceae.

 Species
 Rumfordia alcortae Rzed. - San Luis Potosí, Nuevo León
 Rumfordia connata Brandegee - Baja California Sur
 Rumfordia exauriculata B.L.Turner - Nuevo León
 Rumfordia floribunda DC. - from Sinaloa to Oaxaca
 Rumfordia guatemalensis (J.M.Coult.) S.F.Blake - from Hidalgo to Panamá
 Rumfordia penninervis S.F.Blake - Guatemala, Chiapas, Oaxaca
 Rumfordia revealii H.Rob. - Guerrero
 formerly included
see Axiniphyllum 
 Rumfordia pinnatisecta Paul G.Wilson - Axiniphyllum pinnatisectum (Paul G.Wilson) B.L.Turner

References

Millerieae
Asteraceae genera
Flora of Mexico
Flora of Central America
Taxa named by Augustin Pyramus de Candolle